Lynette "Lyn" Lepore, OAM (born 9 October 1961) is a visually impaired Paralympic tandem cyclist from Perth, Western Australia.  She competed at the 1996 Atlanta Games but did not win any medals at those games.
At the 2000 Sydney Games, she won a gold medal in the Women's Tandem open event, for which she received a Medal of the Order of Australia, a silver medal in the Women's 1 km Time Trial Tandem open event and a bronze medal in the Women's Individual Pursuit Open event, with her pilot Lynette Nixon. In 2000, she received an Australian Sports Medal.

Lepore appealed against Kieran Modra's placement in the Australian Paralympic cycling team at the 2004 Athens Games, in a case that was successful at the Court of Arbitration for Sport. Leading up to the games, Modra was piloted by David Short and Robert Crowe for sprint and endurance events, respectively. The appeal was on the grounds that Lepore deserved her place in the team because when each of Modra's pilot–rider combinations was counted separately, she had a higher rank than Modra. The day before the opening ceremony, the Australian Paralympic Committee successfully appealed to the International Paralympic Committee to give Modra an extra place in the team. Lepore did not win any medals at the 2004 games.

References

Australian female cyclists
Paralympic cyclists of Australia
Paralympic medalists in cycling
Cyclists at the 1996 Summer Paralympics
Cyclists at the 2000 Summer Paralympics
Cyclists at the 2004 Summer Paralympics
Medalists at the 2000 Summer Paralympics
Paralympic gold medalists for Australia
Paralympic silver medalists for Australia
Paralympic bronze medalists for Australia
Paralympic cyclists with a vision impairment
Recipients of the Medal of the Order of Australia
Recipients of the Australian Sports Medal
Cyclists from Perth, Western Australia
Sportswomen from Western Australia
Australian blind people
1961 births
Living people